Jeff Strnad is an American lawyer, currently serving as the Charles A. Beardsley Professor of Law at Stanford Law School.

Education
BA Harvard University 1975
JD Yale Law School 1979
PhD (economics) Yale University Graduate School of Arts and Sciences 1982

References

Living people
Stanford Law School faculty
American lawyers
Harvard University alumni
Yale Law School alumni
Year of birth missing (living people)